Deool is a 2011 Indian Marathi dark comedy directed by Umesh Vinayak Kulkarni and produced by Abhijeet Gholap. The film stars Girish Kulkarni, Nana Patekar, Dilip Prabhawalkar, Sharvani Pillai, Sonali Kulkarni in lead roles. The film is about the effect of globalization on India's small towns and the terrible state of Indian villages, with a political backdrop.

Deool won the 59th National Film Awards for Best Feature Film, Best Actor (Girish Kulkarni) and Best Dialogue (Girish Kulkarni).

The film also marks the debut of veteran Hindi film actor Naseeruddin Shah in Marathi film industry.

Plot
In the rural areas of Maharashtra lies a peaceful village called Mangrul. Keshya (Girish Kulkarni), a simple village youth, who works for Bhau (Nana Patekar) as a cow stockman, takes one of Bhau's cows named "KARDI", to one of the hills in the village where there is an Audumber (Ficus racemosa: Indian fig tree) tree present. KARDI scratches her head over that tree and by which Lord Dattatreya makes a presence and shows his Avtar to Keshya. Keshya, by experiencing God's Avtar, makes a hue and cry in the village saying God Dattatreya made an appearance for him.

Anna (Dillip Prabhavalkar), most respected figure of Mangrul, advises him against announcing such personal matter as it's a question of faith. However, it is too late as a journalist (Kishor Kadam) with the help of a few other village youths who are  more involved in politics, sensationalise the news about Lord Dattatrey making an appearance in Mangrul. 
There is now demand for a Dattatrey temple. Bhau doesn't approve it as he wants the funds to be used for better purposes, as Anna also has vision to build a Hospital in the village. But since Bhau, helpless looking at the village so demanding, the temple is built.
And slowly the village becomes a holy place. Mangrul goes through a 360 degree change due to commercialization, but nobody is complaining except Anna. Soon, blinded by the commercial progress, God is forgotten. Every village has a right to progress commercially, but how ethical it is to use a temple and its good to achieve it?

Cast
 Nana Patekar as Bhau Galande
 Dilip Prabhawalkar as Anna Kulkarni
 Sonali Kulkarni as Vahini
 Girish Kulkarni as Keshav Rambhol
 Jyoti Subhash as Kanta, Keshya's Mother
 Jyoti Malshe as Pinky
 Atisha Naik as Sarpanch (Village head)
 Usha Nadkarni as Sarpanch's Mother in Law
 Kishor Kadam as Mahasangram
 Shrikant Yadav as Appa Galande
 Hrishikesh Joshi as Tommya (Jambuwant Rao)
 Shashank Shende as Ninety (Teacher)
 Sharvani Pillai
 Om Bhutkar as Yuvri
 Mayur Khandge as Emdya
 Suhas Shirsat as Poytya
 Abhijit Khaire as Audience
 Vibhavari Deshpande as Poytya's Sister in Law
 Bhakti Ratnaparakhi as Appa Galande's wife
Guest Appearance
 Mohan Agashe as Aamdar Saheb
 Naseeruddin Shah as Dacoit
 Neha Shitole

Release
Deool was scheduled to be released on 23 September 2011 but was later postponed to November. It was shown in Busan International Film Festival, New York's South Asian International Film Festival, the Abu Dhabi International Film Festival and MAMI in Mumbai, and was released on 4 November 2011 nationwide.

Music
Music of Deool was composed by Mangesh Dhakade and lyrics were penned by Swanand Kirkire, Sudhir Moghe.

Awards and recognition
Deool gathered positive reviews from critics on release. Daily News & Analysis (DNA) gave the film a 4 star rating out of 5 saying, "There’s too much going for Deool. It is an Indian language film to be proud of. For God’s sake, don’t miss it."

The movie won maximum number of awards (3) at 59th National Film Awards in 2011.

National Film Awards
 2011: National Film Award for Best Feature Film
Citation: For its witty, satirical and penetrative account of the politics involved in the commercialization of religion in India. Through a wonderfully authentic depiction of village life, mentality and gesture, Deool has a social, religious and commercial sweep, even as it individualizes each of its characters and endows them with a language and space of their own. The film ironically shows the wholehearted acceptance of commodified and clamorous religiosity in a land plagued by all the serious problems the country faces today, and it does so with laughter that is only slightly tinged with cynicism.
 2011: National Film Award for Best Actor - Girish Kulkarni
Citation: For his role as Kesha, the good hearted village simpleton, who inadvertently sets tumultuous events in motion, is circumspect and tenderhearted. Shorn of histrionics, his performance depends largely on his face and eyes to convey the multitudinous emotions in his mind which he cannot utter. He is controlled yet ingenuous, moving towards the beginnings of an understanding of the world around him, a move that transforms itself unselfconsciously into a spiritual quest.
 2011: National Film Award for Best Screenplay (Best Dialogue) - Girish Kulkarni
Citation: For its immensely varied and textured use of language that is both an authentic and an energetic reflection of the different sections of life shown in the film: the language of the village, of politicians, of the scholar and much else. His dialogues - robustly rustic yet influenced by urban vocabulary - is characteristic of the Indian scene today.

References

External links
 

2011 films
Best Feature Film National Film Award winners
Films featuring a Best Actor National Award-winning performance
Films whose writer won the Best Dialogue National Film Award
2010s Marathi-language films
Hinduism in popular culture